The 1977–78 Houston Aeros season was the Houston Aeros' sixth and final season of operation in the World Hockey Association (WHA). The Aeros again qualified for the playoffs, but lost in the first round to the Quebec Nordiques.

Offseason

Regular season

Final standings

Game log

Playoffs

Quebec Nordiques 4, Houston Aeros 2 – Quarterfinals

Player stats

Note: Pos = Position; GP = Games played; G = Goals; A = Assists; Pts = Points; +/- = plus/minus; PIM = Penalty minutes; PPG = Power-play goals; SHG = Short-handed goals; GWG = Game-winning goals
      MIN = Minutes played; W = Wins; L = Losses; T = Ties; GA = Goals-against; GAA = Goals-against average; SO = Shutouts;

Awards and records

Transactions

Draft picks
Houston's draft picks at the 1977 WHA Amateur Draft.

Farm teams

See also
 1977–78 WHA season

References

External links

Houston
Houston
Houston Aeros seasons